Carlos Soto may refer to:

Carlos Soto Arriví (1959-1978), Puerto Rican pro-independence activists
Carlos Soto (footballer, born 1959), Chile international football defender
Carlos Soto (footballer, born 1965), Chilean football defensive midfielder
Carlos Soto (footballer, born 1984), Argentine football left-back
Carlos Soto (judoka) (fl. 1984), Honduran judoka
Carlos Soto Menegazzo, Guatemalan politician (fl. 2013)